Ivan Stepanovych Marchuk (born 12 May 1936) is a contemporary Ukrainian painter, Honored Artist of Ukraine, laureate of the Shevchenko National Prize, Honorary Citizen of Ternopil and Kyiv.

Early life and education 
Ivan Marchuk was born into a family of weavers. To help the family make ends meet, Marchuk often helped his father with work.  He began to paint when he was a child. In spite of a lack of art materials — e.g., paint, pastel, watercolor, paper — Marchuk managed to make art with the natural pigment of flowers, blades of grass, and fruit. After graduating from a seven-year school, he entered the Ivan Trush Lviv School of Applied Arts in the department of decorative painting, where he studied from 1951 to 1956. While his parents had wanted him to study to become a surgeon or biologist, they dared not stand in the way of his obvious talent and dreams. He described this period of his education as transformative, paying homage to progressive teachers who inspired him to explore beyond the ideological safe space of socialist realism. He ended up joining an underground group in 1959 led by one of his teachers, Karl Zvirynskyi, who introduced its members to unsanctioned art, history, music, literature, and religion.  After serving in the Soviet Army, he continued his studies at the Department of Ceramics of the Lviv Institute of Applied Arts, graduating in 1965. To earn money, he also worked for an organization that made posters and placards for factories, clubs, and theaters.  Later he worked in Kyiv. From 1965 to 1968 he worked at the Institute of Superhard Materials of the National Academy of Sciences of Ukraine. Low pay and residence in a communal apartment, however, made life in the capital difficult for him. To supplement his income, he filled an order from the newspaper "Ranok" for a small drawing and cover design.  In 1968, Marchuk sold his first work for 30 karbovanets to Yuriy Shcherbak.  From 1968 to 1984 at the Kyiv Plant of Monumental and Decorative Arts, he made illustrations for Soviet publications.  In his free time, Marchuk poured his soul into his own art, experimenting with different forms, such as inking and tempera, and looking for ways to get his art abroad.

Professional work and persecution 
It was at this point in his life that the KGB began to harass him for his non-conformist leanings, reaching the peak of their repressive activities in the 1970s.  The Soviet authorities took particular issue with the darker colors used by Marchuk, which they considered ill-placed in the characteristically bright depictions of socialist realism.  In addition to the charges of deviations from socialist realism, the KGB suspected Marchuk of Ukrainian nationalist sympathies; for he came from L’viv, spoke Ukrainian, and depicted Ukrainian figures.  Because the Artists’ Union of the USSR refused to let him into its ranks, he could not participate in exhibitions and sell his work.  It was only in 1980 that Marchuk had his first exhibition in Kyiv, sponsored by the writers Pavlo Zahrebel’nyi and Dmytro Pavlychko.  In 1984, Marchuk was fired from the Kyiv Plant of Monumental and Decorative Arts.  While he was able to sell some work in individual exhibitions held at the department of the arts in the National Library and other institutions, his lack of access to art galleries greatly restricted his opportunities.  When Mikhail Gorbachev became General Secretary in 1985, the KGB ceased harassing Marchuk; thereafter, his hopes to emigrate rose.  In 1988, he got the chance to visit Czechoslovakia, where he made an impression on the art community there. In 1989, he received a visa to travel to Australia and then Canada.  While abroad, the Artists’ Union of the USSR finally granted him membership, though apparently without notifying him. In 1990, his first official exhibition took place in Kyiv at the State Art Museum of Ukrainian Fine Arts (now the National Art Museum of Ukraine). Not having been valued in the Soviet Union, Marchuk was well accepted in the independent Ukraine, obtaining the prestigious T. Shevchenko award in 1997.

Recent activity 
No matter the distance travelled abroad, he never lost his love of the Ukrainian land, which he continued to depict in his extremely detailed landscape drawings. In 2001, he decided to move back to Ukraine. He finally returned in 2011. Since an announcement by then-president Viktor Yushchenko in 2005, there have been tentative plans to build a museum for Ivan Marchuk and his work in Kyiv.

Style and legacy 
Ivan Marchuk has produced over 4,000 works in his lifetime, half of which are located outside of Ukraine. He has displayed his work in numerous countries, including Latvia, Germany, Poland, Belgium, Hungary, Czech Republic, Slovakia, Turkey, Luxembourg, Thailand, Tunis, and others. He is well-known as the creator of the art technique “plyontanism”, which is characterized by high levels of detailed strokes that appear to weave into one another.  Though some have likened his style to hyperrealism, Marchuk himself disagrees with this label.

Books 
Atlant UMC has published 3 books on the artist's oeuvre. A large monograph titled "Ivan Marchuk" (2004) illustrates all stages of his creative career. The second album deals with the period 1965-2005. The third album was published in the series "Painting" (2008).

For 2013-2016, Fenix published three books by Ivan Marchuk.

In February 2017, Felix published a catalogue of Marchuk’s early work, titled “Ivan Marchuk’s Painting Parables: The Early Period.” German art expert Olena Balun and Ukrainian researcher Tamara Strypko wrote the foreword.

In February 2018, Folkart Gallery published the book “Echo of Dreams” in Ukrainian, English, and Turkish, containing 300 of the artist’s canvases.

Ivan Marchuk Prize 
On 31 May 2016, the third session of the Ternopil Oblast Council supported the project to launch the annual Ivan Marchuk Regional Award for Gifted Children aged 7 to 15 in the field of fine arts in 2016.

Distinctions and awards 

 1996 — received the title of Honored Artist of Ukraine
 7 March 1997 — became a laureate of the Shevchenko National Prize of Ukraine
 2006 — The International Academy of Contemporary Art in Rome accepted Ivan Marchuk into the ranks of the Golden Guild and elected him an honorary member of the scientific council of the academy

References

Literature 
 "Virtual Dreams of Ivan Marchuk". Welcome to Ukraine, 4, 1999.
 Ivan Marchuk: Album-catalogue. — Kyiv: CJSC Atlant UMS, 2004. — 519 p. — . 
 Ivan Marchuk. Creative period 1965–2005: [Album]. — [Kyiv: CJSC Atlant UMS, 2005]. — 28 p. 
 Іван Марчук. Дорога додому: Альбом. — К.: ТОВ «Атлант ЮЕмСі», 2008. — [135] с. — .

External links

Ivan Marchuk Exhibition

1936 births
Living people
People from Ternopil Oblast
20th-century Ukrainian painters
20th-century Ukrainian male artists
21st-century Ukrainian painters
21st-century Ukrainian male artists
Recipients of the Shevchenko National Prize
Ukrainian artists
Ukrainian male painters